James Crease (born 1949) is a Scottish football manager and former player.

Crease played for Berwick Rangers and Albion Rovers in the Scottish Football League. He has since managed Albion Rovers, Arniston Rangers, Fauldhouse United, Linlithgow Rose and he has had four spells as manager of Berwick Rangers.

Crease first managed Berwick between 1992 and 1994. He then managed Albion Rovers, but resigned from that position in December 1995. Following a spell managing Junior teams in the East of Scotland Junior League, he returned to Berwick in 2005 as general manager. Following the resignation of John Coughlin in October 2007, Michael Renwick in April 2008 and Alan McGonigal in November 2008, he acted as caretaker manager. Following the resignation of McGonigall he said that he would only act as a caretaker but it was announced on 20 December 2008 that he would retain the managers position until the end of the 2008–09 season. Berwick reached the fourth round of the 2010–11 Scottish Cup, where they lost 2–0 to eventual winners Celtic. They also defeated Partick Thistle in the 2011–12 Scottish League Cup, but Crease left the club in October 2011 after Berwick was beaten in a 2011–12 Scottish Cup tie by Deveronvale.

Crease has twice returned to Linlithgow Rose as a caretaker manager, following the sackings of Todd Lumsden in May 2017 and Mark Bradley in October 2019.

References

Scottish footballers
Scottish Junior Football Association players
Scottish Football League players
Berwick Rangers F.C. players
Albion Rovers F.C. players
Scottish football managers
Albion Rovers F.C. managers
Berwick Rangers F.C. managers
Living people
Bonnyrigg Rose Athletic F.C. players
Arniston Rangers F.C. players
1949 births
Scottish Football League managers
Association football forwards